Oxalis massoniana, Masson's wood sorrel, is a species of flowering plant in the family Oxalidaceae, native only to Van Rhyns Pass, South Africa. It has gained the Royal Horticultural Society's Award of Garden Merit.

References

massoniana
Endemic flora of South Africa
Flora of the Cape Provinces
Plants described in 1936